Karl the Butcher vs. Axe is a 2010 horror comedy film directed by Andreas Schnaas and Timo Rose. It is the fifth appearance of Schnaas' Karl the Butcher character, the lead antagonist in his Violent Shit film series.

Plot
2023 and Karl the Butcher Jr (Schnaas) returns from hell after 25 years, and is on a mission to kill a new mass murderer, Axe (Rose). The world he returns to, however, is in devastation, with civilization split between violent factions: the Gang Loco, The Others, the tyrant Queen Scara, The Black Monks, and the nomadic Axe and his sister Vendetta, whose family history is unknown.

Cast
Andreas Schnaas as Karl the Butcher
Timo Rose as Axe
Magdalèna Kalley as Vendetta
Eileen Daly as Queen Scara
Eleanor James as She-Maa
Marysia Kay as Mathra

References

External links
 

2010 films
2010 comedy horror films
German comedy horror films
German splatter films
Films directed by Andreas Schnaas
2010s German films